Miss Malaysia Universe 1989, the 23rd edition of the Miss Universe Malaysia, was held on 19 March 1989 at the Hyatt Saujana Hotel, Kuala Lumpur. Carmen Swee of Penang was crowned by the outgoing titleholder, Linda Lum of Johor at the end of the event. She then represented Malaysia at the Miss Universe 1989 pageant in Cancun, Mexico.

Results

Withdrawals 
 – Nor Albaniah Rafie was withdrew due to sickness on the first week of the pageant.

References 

1989 in Malaysia
1989 beauty pageants
1989